The Thief Who Came to Dinner is a 1973 American comedy film directed by Bud Yorkin. Based on the novel by Terrence Lore Smith, the film stars Ryan O'Neal and Jacqueline Bisset, with Charles Cioffi, Warren Oates, and in an early appearance, Jill Clayburgh.

Plot
Webster McGee is a computer programmer who abruptly quits his job and adopts a life of crime as a jewel thief in Houston, Texas.

For his first job he robs rich businessman Henderling, stealing from him not only money but also files with information that could destroy Henderling's career. McGee uses these files to blackmail Henderling. Instead of money, he asks for introduction into high society — aiming to find a way to rob other rich houses.

McGee soon meets Laura at a society function hosted by Henderling. She falls in love with McGee and then helps him to burglarize several friends of Henderling.

Texas Mutual Insurance investigator Dave Reilly is intent on identifying McGee as the jewel thief, but in the course of investigation Reilly and McGee develop a sort of friendship. Reilly must decide whether to be loyal to his job or his new friend.

Cast

Production
In November 1970 it was announced Yorkin and Lear's Tandem Productions had bought the rights to the novel and would make it in association with Warner Bros. Yorkin later said the wanted to make the film as a tribute to "that great Cary Grant escape period."

Oliver Hailey wrote the first draft of the script. The novel was published in March 1971 and the New York Times said "there is something engaging about all this nonsense".

Walter Hill was hired to write a number of subsequent drafts, and received sole credit.

The casting of Warren Oates and Ryan O'Neal was announced in December 1971. Charlotte Rampling was originally announced as the female lead. Rampling fell pregnant and was replaced by Jacqueline Bisset.

Filming took place on location in Houston. Locations included the Johnson Space Center, the Astrodome, the Museum of Fine Arts, Rice University, the Mecom Fountain, Jones Hall, the Alley Theatre, River Oaks, Buffalo Bayou, West University Place, Montrose, Fourth Ward, the Bob Lanier Public Works Building, the El Paso Energy Building, St. Vincent De Paul Catholic Church, the former Houston Independent School District (HISD) headquarters, the former Trail Drive-In, and an area by the Houston Ship Channel.

During filming, Yorkin and Lear had the number one, two and four show in the country (All in the Family, Sanford and Son and Maude). "I don't think it's the greatest picture in the world but it is very entertaining", said Yorkin.

Bisset later admitted her role in the film was "undeveloped" and said she had some qualms about the morality of the movie. "I think stealing is dishonest. But it's only a movie." However she enjoyed shooting in Houston saying "I thought it would be ghastly. But the people were so terribly nice to us. Their houses were just unreal."

Reception
Walter Hill later said "Warren Oates was very good in the movie – better than the movie was. They cut a lot of things of his out of the movie they shouldn't have."

The Los Angeles Times wrote that the film was "as amusing to watch as it is disturbing to think about afterwards" and that O'Neal and Bisset made "a terrific team."

O'Neal later listed the film as among those he said he should not have done.

References

External links 
 
 
This Thief Who Came to Dinner at TCMDB

1973 films
Films set in Houston
Films shot in Houston
1973 comedy films
Films directed by Bud Yorkin
Films based on American novels
American heist films
Films scored by Henry Mancini
Films with screenplays by Walter Hill
1970s English-language films
1970s American films